The High Country Rail Trail is a 35 kilometre, part-gravel part-sealed rail trail on the northern border of Victoria, Australia. It runs along the former Cudgewa railway line from Wodonga, along the edge of Lake Hume, to Shelley railway station in the former township of Shelley, Victoria.  The eight kilometre section east from Tallangatta to Old Tallangatta is sealed; the remainining sections are not sealed but are accessible on hybrid, gravel, or mountain bikes.  

The section from Bullioh to Shelley features a long but gradual climb, reaching 779 metres of altitude at Shelley.  The climb features easy grades of 2-3%.

The rail trail features extensive views of Lake Hume from Wodonga to Tallangatta, and several historic trestle bridges on the climb to Shelley.  However, there are no facilities available from Tallangatta to Koetong; riders will need to be prepared with sufficient food and water.
  
There are plans to eventually extend the trail as far as Cudgewa near Corryong.

External links 
 www.highcountryrailtrail.org.au - official site
 Trail map

References 

Rail trails in Victoria (Australia)